This list of "sequenced" eukaryotic genomes contains all the eukaryotes known to have publicly available complete nuclear and organelle genome sequences that have been sequenced, assembled, annotated and published; draft genomes are not included, nor are organelle-only sequences.

DNA was first sequenced in 1977. The first free-living organism to have its genome completely sequenced was the bacterium Haemophilus influenzae, in 1995. In 1996 Saccharomyces cerevisiae (baker's yeast) was the first eukaryote genome sequence to be released and in 1998 the first genome sequence for a multicellular eukaryote, Caenorhabditis elegans, was released.

Protists
Following are the nine earliest sequenced genomes of protists. For a more complete list, see the List of sequenced protist genomes.

Plants
Following are the five earliest sequenced genomes of plants. For a more complete list, see the List of sequenced plant genomes.

Fungi
Following are the five earliest sequenced genomes of fungi. For a more complete list, see the List of sequenced fungi genomes.

Animals
Following are the five earliest sequenced genomes of animals. For a more complete list, see the List of sequenced animal genomes.

See also
Genome project, Human genome
Genomic organization
History of genetics
List of sequenced animal genomes
List of sequenced archaeal genomes
List of sequenced bacterial genomes
List of sequenced fungi genomes
 List of sequenced plant genomes
 List of sequenced plastomes
 List of sequenced protist genomes

References

External links 
 Diark - a resource for eukaryotic genome research
 EMBL-EBL Eukaryotic Genomes
 UCSC Genome Browser
 International Sequencing Consortium - Large-scale Sequencing Project Database
 Ensembl The Ensembl Genome Browser (includes draft and low coverage genomes)
 GOLD:Genomes OnLine Database v 3.0
 SUPERFAMILY comparative genomics database Includes genomes of all completely sequenced eukaryotes, and sophisticated datamining plus visualisation tools for analysis
 Rat Genome Database

Eukaryotic genomes
Eukaryotic genomes